The Political History of the Devil is a 1726 book by Daniel Defoe.

General scholarly opinion is that Defoe really did think of the Devil as a participant in world history.  He spends some time discussing John Milton's Paradise Lost and explaining why he considers it inaccurate.

His view is that of an 18th-century Presbyterian – he blames the Devil for the Crusades and sees him as close to Europe's Catholic powers.  The book was banned by the Roman Catholic Church.

Trivia
The book is listed as one belonging to Mr. Tulliver and read by his daughter Maggie in George Eliot's The Mill on the Floss.

See also
De Betoverde Weereld

References

Further reading
Baine, Rodney M. (1962).  Daniel Defoe and "The History and Reality of Apparitions". Proceedings of the American Philosophical Society, 106(4): 335–347. 
Hudson, Nicholas (1988). 'Why God no Kill the Devil?' The Diabolical Disruption of Order in Robinson Crusoe. The Review of English Studies, 39(156): 494–501.

External links
Online at Archive.org
 
Literary Encyclopedia entry

1726 books
Demonological literature
Satan
Works by Daniel Defoe
Censored books